The 84th District of the Iowa House of Representatives in the state of Iowa.

Current elected officials
Joe Mitchell is the representative currently representing the district.

Past representatives
The district has previously been represented by:
 Andrew Varley, 1971–1973
 William R. Monroe, 1973–1979
 Larry Kirkenslager, 1979–1982
 Elaine Baxter, 1982–1983
 Jack Holveck, 1983–1993
 Brent Siegrist, 1993–2003
 Jamie Van Fossen, 2003–2007
 Elesha Gayman, 2007–2011
 Ross Paustian, 2011–2013
 Dave Heaton, 2013–2019
 Joe Mitchell, 2019–present

References

084